American singer-songwriter and actress JoJo has been featured in nineteen music videos, three theatrical films, one television film, and twelve television series including her first appearances on talent shows during her early years. She released her first music video for her debut single "Leave (Get Out)" was in early 2004 and since then she has released eleven other music videos and one lyric video as a lead artist. She appears in one music video as featured artist, one music video as a charitable featured artist and made a guest appearances in another five. JoJo made her television debut as a contestant on the Kids Say the Darndest Things hosted by Bill Cosby in 1998 at age 7 and made her first TV series appearance on The Bernie Mac Show as Michelle in mid 2002. Additionally, she starred in two big budget Hollywood films in 2006, Aquamarine as Hailey Rogers and RV as Cassie Munroe alongside Robin Williams & Josh Hutcherson as well as in the Lifetime made-for-TV movie True Confessions of a Hollywood Starlet in 2008.

Music videos

As lead artist

As featured artist

Charity

Other appearances

Filmography

See also
 JoJo discography

References

External links 
 

Actress filmographies
American filmographies
Videographies of American artists